Carey Cawood (30 December 1918 – 22 December 2000) was a South African cricketer. He played in two first-class matches for Eastern Province in 1939/40 and 1949/50.

See also
 List of Eastern Province representative cricketers

References

External links
 

1918 births
2000 deaths
South African cricketers
Eastern Province cricketers
Gauteng cricketers
People from Graaff-Reinet
Cricketers from the Eastern Cape